Casanova is a 1934 French comedy drama film directed by René Barberis and starring Ivan Mozzhukhin, Jeanne Boitel and Madeleine Ozeray.

Cast
 Ivan Mozzhukhin as Casanova 
 Jeanne Boitel as Anne Roman, Baronne de Meilly-Coulonge  
 Madeleine Ozeray as Angelica  
 Marcelle Denya as La Pompadour  
 Colette Darfeuil as La Corticelli  
 Marguerite Moreno as Madame Morin  
 Saturnin Fabre as M. Binetti  
 Pierre Larquey as Pogomas  
 Émile Drain as Mgr de Bernis  
 Pierre Moreno as Castelbougnac  
 Henry Laverne as Leduc 
 Leda Ginelly as Mme Binetti  
 Marthe Mussine as Une Servante  
 Nicole de Rouves as Signora Manzoni  
 Véra Markels as Femme du Gouverneur  
 Victor Vina as M. de Sartine  
 Wanda Warel as Une Soubrette  
 Jacques Normand as Bragadin, un inquisiteur  
 Jean Guilton as Le Gouverneur  
 Léon Larive as M. de Boulogne  
 Jacqueline Hopstein as Mme de Haussey, confidente 
 Suzy Delair
 Jean Delannoy 
 Loulou Rex

References

Bibliography 
 Philippe Rège. Encyclopedia of French Film Directors, Volume 1. Scarecrow Press, 2009.

External links 
 

1934 films
1930s historical comedy-drama films
French historical comedy-drama films
1930s French-language films
Films directed by René Barberis
Films set in the 18th century
Films about Giacomo Casanova
Cultural depictions of Madame de Pompadour
French black-and-white films
1930s French films